Alloway is an extended village and suburb of Ayr on the River Doon in Scotland.

Alloway may also refer to:

Places
 Alloway (cottage), located in Moree, New South Wales, Australia
 Alloway Creek, US
 Alloway railway station, a disused railway station in South Ayrshire, Scotland
 Alloway Township, New Jersey, US
 Alloway (CDP), New Jersey, a census-designated place in the township
 Alloway, New York, a hamlet in the town of Lyons
 Alloway, Tennessee, an unincorporated community in the US

People
 Lawrence Alloway (1926–1990), English art critic
 Tracy Packiam Alloway, British psychologist

Ships
, the name of more than one US Navy ship

See also

Alloa

pt:Alloway